The International Council for Central and East European Studies (ICCEES) is an international network of researchers in the field of Russian, Central and East European studies. The ICCEES was founded in 1974, and its chief activities are a biannual newsletter as well as a congress organized every five years, so far in Banff, Garmisch-Partenkirchen, Washington, D.C., Harrogate, WarsawTampere, Berlin and Stockholm.

Among its members are the British Association for Slavonic and East European Studies, the Deutsche Gesellschaft für Osteuropakunde, Sällskapet för studier av Ryssland, Central- och Östeuropa samt Centralasien., the Finnish Association for Russian and East European Studies, the Associazione Italiana degli Slavisti (AIS), Italy, the Australasian Association for Communist and Post-communist Studies (AACaPS),  the Australian and New Zealand Slavists’ Association (ANZSA), the Canadian Association of Slavists (CAS), the Chinese Association for Russian, East European and Central Asian Studies (CAERCAS), the Irish Association for Russian, Central and East European Studies (IARCEES), the Japan Council of Russian and East European Studies (JCREES), the Korea Association of Slavic and Eurasian Studies (KASEUS), the Société française d’études russes et est-européennes en sciences sociales (SFERES), and the Swedish Society for the Study of Russia, Central and Eastern Europe and Central Asia  The American Association for Slavonic, European and East European Studies (ASEEES) ceased paying dues in 2017 and formally withdrew its membership in 2020. No pertinent cause was given.

See also

Archives 
There is a International Council for Central and East European Studies fonds at Library and Archives Canada. The archival reference number is R3997.

References

External links
 http://www.iccees.org/ - official web site

Organizations established in 1974